Norman Nathan Lloyd ( Perlmutter; November 8, 1914 – May 11, 2021) was an American actor, producer, director, and centenarian with a career in entertainment spanning nearly a century. He worked in every major facet of the industry, including theatre, radio, television, and film, with a career that started in 1923. Lloyd's final film, Trainwreck, was released in 2015, after he turned 100.

In the 1930s, he apprenticed with Eva Le Gallienne's Civic Repertory Theatre and worked with such influential groups as the Federal Theatre Project's Living Newspaper unit, the Mercury Theatre, and the Group Theatre. Lloyd's long professional association with Alfred Hitchcock began with his performance portraying a Nazi agent in the film Saboteur (1942). He also appeared in Spellbound (1945), and was a producer of Hitchcock's anthology television series Alfred Hitchcock Presents. Lloyd directed and produced episodic television throughout the 1950s, 1960s and 1970s. As an actor, he appeared in over 60 films and television shows, with his roles including Bodalink in Charlie Chaplin's Limelight (1952), Mr. Nolan in Dead Poets Society (1989), and Mr. Letterblair in The Age of Innocence (1993). In the 1980s, Lloyd gained a new generation of fans for playing Dr. Daniel Auschlander, one of the starring roles on the medical drama St. Elsewhere.

Early life and theatre

Lloyd was born Norman Nathan Perlmutter on November 8, 1914, in Jersey City, New Jersey. His family was Jewish and lived in Brooklyn, New York. His father, Max Perlmutter, was an accountant who later became a salesman and proprietor of a furniture store. His mother, Sadie Horowitz Perlmutter, was a bookkeeper and housewife. She had a good voice and a lifelong interest in the theatre, and she took her young son to singing and dancing lessons. He had two sisters, Ruth and Janice, who survived her brother by four months. Lloyd became a child performer, appearing at vaudeville benefits and women's clubs, and was a professional by the age of nine.
Lloyd graduated from high school when he was 15 and began studies at New York University, but left at the end of his sophomore year. "All around me I could see the way the Depression was affecting everyone; for my family, for people in business like my father, it was a terrible time," he wrote. "I just wasn't going to stay in college, paying tuition to get a degree to be a lawyer, when I could see lawyers who had become taxi drivers." Lloyd's father died in 1945, at age 55, "broken by the world that he was living in."

In 1932, at age 17, Lloyd auditioned and became the youngest of the apprentices under the direction of May Sarton at Eva Le Gallienne's Civic Repertory Theatre in New York City. He then joined Sarton's Apprentice Theatre in New Hampshire, continuing his studies with her and her associate, Eleanor Flexner. The group rehearsed a total of ten modern European plays and performed at The New School for Social Research and in Boston. Members of the Harvard Dramatic Club saw Lloyd on stage and offered him the lead in a play directed by Joseph Losey. He rejoined Sarton's group, for whom Losey directed a Boston production of Gods of the Lightning. When Sarton was forced to give up her company, Losey suggested that Lloyd audition for a production of André Obey's Noah (1935). It was Lloyd's first Broadway show.

Through Losey, Lloyd became involved in the social theatre of the 1930s, beginning with an acting collective called The Theatre of Action. The group was preparing a production of Michael Blankfort's The Crime (1936),
 directed by Elia Kazan. One of the company members was Peggy Craven, who would later become Lloyd's wife.

Losey brought Lloyd into the Federal Theatre Project — which Lloyd called "one of the great theaters of all time"— and its Living Newspapers, which dramatized contemporary events. They initially prepared Ethiopia, about the Italian invasion, which was deemed too controversial and was terminated. The first completed presentation was Triple-A Plowed Under (1936), followed by Injunction Granted (1936) and Power (1937).

When Orson Welles and John Houseman left the Federal Theatre Project to form their own independent repertory theatre company, the Mercury Theatre, Lloyd was invited to become a charter member. He played a memorable role in its first stage production, Caesar (1937), Welles's modern-dress adaptation of Shakespeare's tragedy Julius Caesar — streamlined into an anti-fascist tour- de-force. In a scene that became the fulcrum of the show, Cinna the Poet (Lloyd) dies at the hands not of a mob but of a secret police force. Lloyd called it "an extraordinary scene [that] gripped the audience in a way that the show stopped for about three minutes. The audience stopped it with applause. It showed the audience what fascism was; rather than an intellectual approach, you saw a physical one."

The Mercury prepared The Shoemaker's Holiday to go into repertory with Caesar beginning in January 1938. During the December 25 performance of Caesar — when the sets, lighting, and costumes for Shoemaker were ready but no previews had taken place — Welles asked the cast if they cared to present a surprise preview immediately after the show. He invited the audience to stay and watch the set changes, and the curtain rose at 1:15 a.m. Lloyd recalled it as "the wildest triumph imaginable. The show was a smash during its run — but never again did we have a performance like that one."

Lloyd performed on the first of four releases in the Mercury Text Records series, phonographic recordings of Shakespeare plays adapted for educators by Welles and Roger Hill. The Merchant of Venice features Lloyd in the roles of Salanio and Launcelot Gobbo. Released on Columbia Masterworks Records in 1939, the recording was reissued on CD in 1998.

Lloyd played the role of Johnny Appleseed in Everywhere I Roam (1938), a play by Arnold Sundgaard that was developed by the Federal Theatre Project and staged on Broadway by Marc Connelly. "It was a lovely experience, although the play failed," Lloyd recalled. "For me, it was a success; in those days, before the Tony Awards, the critics' Ten Best Performers list at the end of the year was the greatest recognition. For my performance, I was selected to be on the list by the critics."

Films

In late summer 1939, Lloyd was invited to Hollywood, to join Welles and other Mercury Theatre members in the first film being prepared for RKO Pictures — Heart of Darkness. Given a six-week guarantee at $500 a week, he took part in a reading for the film, which was to be presented entirely through a first-person camera. After elaborate pre-production the project never reached production because Welles was unable to trim $50,000 from its budget, something RKO insisted upon as its revenue was declining sharply in Europe by autumn 1939. Welles asked the actors to stay a few more weeks as he put together another film project, but Lloyd was ill-advised by a member of the radio company and impulsively returned to New York. "Those who stayed did Citizen Kane," Lloyd wrote. "I have always regretted it."

Lloyd later returned to Hollywood to play a Nazi spy in Alfred Hitchcock's Saboteur (1942), beginning a long friendship and professional association with Hitchcock. Three years later he was cast by French director Jean Renoir to portray the malicious, dull-witted character Finley in The Southerner, which was the fourth film of six productions that Renoir directed in the 1940s while living in the United States. After a few more villainous screen roles, Lloyd then worked behind the camera as an assistant on Lewis Milestone's Arch of Triumph (1948). A friend of John Garfield, Lloyd performed with him in the 1951 film noir crime drama He Ran All the Way, Garfield's last film before the Hollywood blacklist ended his film career.

Post-war career
A marginal victim of the Hollywood blacklist, Lloyd was rescued professionally by Hitchcock, who had previously cast the actor in Saboteur and Spellbound (1945). Hitchcock hired Lloyd as an associate producer and a director on his television series Alfred Hitchcock Presents in 1958. Previously, Lloyd directed the sponsored film A Word to the Wives (1955) with Marsha Hunt and Darren McGavin. He continued directing and producing episodic television throughout the 1960s and 1970s. He took an unusual role in the Night Gallery episode "A Feast of Blood" as the bearer of a cursed brooch, which he inflicts upon a hapless woman, played by Sondra Locke, who had spurned his romantic advances. In FM (1978), Lloyd has a small but pivotal role as the owner of a Los Angeles radio station that is undergoing a mutiny of sorts, due to a battle over advertising. Lloyd's character (Carl Billings) ends up playing the white hat role and keeping the station as is, to the delight of staff and fans.

In the 1980s, Lloyd played Dr. Daniel Auschlander in the television drama St. Elsewhere over its six-season run (1982–88). Originally scheduled for only four episodes, Lloyd became a regular for the rest of the series. In addition to Ed Flanders and William Daniels, St. Elsewhere included a roster of relative unknowns, including Ed Begley, Jr., Denzel Washington, Stephen Furst, Eric Laneuville, David Morse, and Howie Mandel.

Lloyd's first film role in nearly a decade was in Dead Poets Society (1989), playing Mr. Nolan, the authoritarian headmaster of Welton Academy, opposite Robin Williams. Initially, Lloyd was hesitant when asked to audition, because he thought the director and producers could judge whether or not he was right for the part by watching his acting on St. Elsewhere. Director Peter Weir was living in Australia and had not seen St. Elsewhere. Lloyd agreed to audition for him after winning his daily tennis match.

From 1998 to 2001, he played Dr. Isaac Mentnor in the UPN science fiction drama Seven Days. His numerous television guest-star appearances include The Joseph Cotten Show; Murder, She Wrote; The Twilight Zone; Wiseguy; Star Trek: The Next Generation; Wings; The Practice; and Civil Wars.

He played in various radio plays for Peggy Webber's California Artists Radio Theater and Yuri Rasovsky's Hollywood Theater of the Ear. His last film role was in Trainwreck (2015) which he acted in at the age of 99, although he admitted he was slightly put off by the film's raunchy content. He is the subject of the documentary Who Is Norman Lloyd?, which premiered at the Sundance Film Festival on September 1, 2007. In 2010, he guest-starred in an episode of ABC's Modern Family. On December 5, 2010, he presented An Evening with Norman Lloyd at the Colony Theatre in Burbank, California, where he spoke about his career and answered questions from the audience.

Personal life and death

On June 29, 1936, Lloyd married stage actress Peggy Craven. Together, they had two children: Michael, and actress Josie, who died the year before Lloyd. They remained married for 75 years until her death in 2011.
Lloyd began practicing his lifelong hobby of tennis at the age of 8. "With the application and time I have devoted to it, I should have been a reigning World Champion", he said in a 2000 interview. His opponents included Charlie Chaplin, Joseph Cotten, and Spencer Tracy. Lloyd continued to play twice a week until July 2015, when he had a fall. He stopped driving in 2014 at Michael's insistence.

Lloyd turned 100 on November 8, 2014. Two of his longtime friends and understudies, Ed Begley Jr. and Howie Mandel (both of whom co-starred with Lloyd on St. Elsewhere), reflected on his centenarian celebration; Begley, Jr. said: "I [have] worked with Norman Lloyd the actor and Norman Lloyd the director, and no one [has] informed me better on the art of storytelling than that talented man. He is a constant inspiration, and my eternal friend"; Mandel added, "I love Norman Lloyd. He is a legend. I have spent hours like a little kid while he regaled us with stories of Hitchcock. He teaches, he entertains. He is a legend."

On October 25, 2017, two weeks before his 103rd birthday, Lloyd attended Game 2 of the 2017 World Series in Los Angeles. Ninety-one years earlier, at the age of 11, he attended Game 1 of the 1926 World Series at Yankee Stadium.

Lloyd died in his sleep at his home in the Brentwood neighborhood of Los Angeles, California, on May 11, 2021, at the age of 106.

Cultural references
In Me and Orson Welles (2008), Richard Linklater's period drama set in the days surrounding the premiere of the Mercury Theatre's production of Caesar, Lloyd is portrayed by Leo Bill.

Select theatre credits

As actor

As director

Select radio credits

Select film and television credits

As actor

Film

Television

As director, producer

Accolades

References

External links

"The Man Who Fell Off the Statue of Liberty: An Interview with Norman Lloyd" at TCM's Movie Morlocks (March 2, 2010)
Norman Lloyd at Filmreference.com

1914 births
2021 deaths
20th-century American male actors
21st-century American male actors
American centenarians
American male film actors
American male radio actors
American male stage actors
American male television actors
American people of Jewish descent
American television directors
Hollywood blacklist
Jewish American male actors
Male actors from Jersey City, New Jersey
Male actors from New York City
Men centenarians
New York University alumni
People from Brooklyn
Federal Theatre Project people
Television producers from New York City
Vaudeville performers
21st-century American Jews